The Extraordinary and Plenipotentiary Ambassador of Peru to the Federal Republic of Germany is the official representative of the Republic of Peru to the Federal Republic of Germany.

Peru officially established bilateral relations with modern Germany's predecessors in 1828, among them the North German Confederation in 1870 (which was succeeded by the German Empire) and have since maintained diplomatic relations with two exceptions where Peru has severed its relations: on October 5, 1917, as a result of World War I (later reestablished with the Weimar Republic on May 28, 1920) and January 24, 1942, as a result of the German Reich's declaration of war against the United States during World War II.

After the Second World War, relations were reestablished on January 31, 1951, with the Federal Republic of Germany. After the 1968 Peruvian coup d'état and the establishment of Juan Velasco Alvarado's Revolutionary Government, relations with the German Democratic Republic were also established on December 28, 1972.

List of representatives

German Reich (1871–1917; 1920–1942)

German Democratic Republic (1972–1990)

Federal Republic of Germany (1951–present)

See also
List of ambassadors of Germany to Peru
List of ambassadors of Peru to Austria
List of ambassadors of Peru to Hungary
List of ambassadors of Peru to the Soviet Union
List of ambassadors of Peru to Czechoslovakia
List of ambassadors of Peru to Yugoslavia
List of ambassadors of Peru to Bulgaria
List of ambassadors of Peru to Albania
List of ambassadors of Peru to Romania
List of ambassadors of Peru to Poland

References

Peru
Germany
Ambassadors of Peru to Germany